Two ships of the Royal Navy have been named HMS Wren after the bird.

 , a  launched at Yarrow in 1919 and sunk by aircraft off Aldeburgh on 27 July 1940.
 , a Modified  sloop launched on 11 August 1942 and, as part of Captain Frederic Walker's Second Escort Group, assisted in the sinking of several U-boats. Broken up in 1956.

References
 

Royal Navy ship names